Notorhizodon is a genus of prehistoric lobe-finned fish which lived during the Devonian period (Givetian stage, about 385 - 391 million years ago). It belonged to the family of Tristichopteridae fishes. Fossils have been found in Antarctica and described by Young et al. in 1992. Notorhizodon probably lived in freshwaters.

References 

Tristichopterids
Devonian bony fish
Prehistoric lobe-finned fish genera
Prehistoric fish of Antarctica